Seán Crowe (born 7 March 1957) is an Irish Sinn Féin politician who has been a Teachta Dála (TD) for the Dublin South-West constituency since the 2011 general election, and previously from 2002 to 2007. He was appointed Chair of the Committee on Health in September 2020.

Crowe was born in Dublin in 1957. He is married to Pamela Kane, and they live in Tallaght. He worked as a community activist in the area, campaigning on such issues as the local hospital, transport, drugs and affordable housing.

During the 1990s, when the current Northern Ireland peace process was initiated, Crowe was the head of the Sinn Féin mission to the Forum for Peace and Reconciliation at Dublin Castle and was a member of Sinn Féin negotiating team.

Crowe has represented the party in the multi-party negotiations that led up to the Good Friday Agreement in 1998.

He has been involved in politics since 1989, when he stood unsuccessfully for Dublin South-West at the 1989 general election. He contested the constituency again in 1992 and 1997, significantly increasing his vote share on the latter occasion. In 1999, he was elected as a South Dublin County Councillor, representing the Tallaght South local electoral area. On the same day he was an unsuccessful candidate for the Dublin constituency for the European Parliament.

He was elected to Dáil Éireann at the 2002 general election. He lost his seat at the 2007 general election. In September 2008, he returned to South Dublin County Council when he was co-opted to replace a party colleague and retained the seat at the 2009 local elections. He regained his Dáil seat in Dublin South-West in 2011, and was re-elected at the 2016 and 2020 general elections.

He is a former member of the Sinn Féin Ard Chomhairle (National Executive).

References

External links
Seán Crowe's page on the Sinn Féin website

 

1957 births
Living people
Local councillors in South Dublin (county)
Members of the 29th Dáil
Members of the 31st Dáil
Members of the 32nd Dáil
Politicians from Dublin (city)
Sinn Féin TDs (post-1923)
Members of the 33rd Dáil